Legends of Wrestling is a professional wrestling video game based on the greatest wrestlers of all time, from WWF/WWE, NWA, WCW, WCCW, AWA, ECW and various independent promotions. It was developed and published by Acclaim. It was released in 2001 for the PlayStation 2, then in 2002 for the GameCube and Xbox.

Reception

The game was met with "mixed or average" reviews, according to review aggregator Metacritic.

The Cincinnati Enquirer gave the PS2 version a score of four stars out of five and said that its characters "have an exaggerated action-figure look, but they move smoothly and have a robust collection of moves." However, Playboy gave the same version a score of 60% and said, "Unless you're desperate to see Captain Lou Albano in action again (and who isn't?), scant reason for a purchase presents itself. Casual wrestling fans can pass." BBC Sport gave said version a score of 56%, stating: "When you press a button to pull off a move there's far too long a wait for any action, and the game actually builds up a queue which can mean you are waiting for moves to happen before you can continue."

Sequels

A sequel to the game, titled Legends of Wrestling II, was released in 2002 for the Game Boy Advance, PlayStation 2, GameCube and Xbox. The series was followed by a third sequel, titled Showdown: Legends of Wrestling, was released in 2004, for the PlayStation 2 and Xbox.

See also

List of licensed wrestling video games
List of fighting games
Legends of Wrestling (series)
Legends of Wrestling II
Showdown: Legends of Wrestling

References

External links

2001 video games
Legends of Wrestling 1
GameCube games
Legends of Wrestling (series)
PlayStation 2 games
Video games with custom soundtrack support
Xbox games
Professional wrestling games
Video games based on real people
Cultural depictions of professional wrestlers
Video games developed in the United States